Shakespeare Inn is a 17th-century pub on Victoria Street, in Bristol, England. It is a timber-framed house, dated 1636 on the front, which was extensively restored in 1950, under the direction of F.L. Hannam, and re-roofed in 1992. It has been designated by English Heritage as a grade II listed building.

References

Buildings and structures completed in the 17th century
Grade II listed pubs in Bristol
Timber framed buildings in England
17th-century architecture in the United Kingdom
Pubs in Gloucestershire